Matthew Etim  (born 2 September 1989), is a Nigerian professional footballer who plays as a right back for Akwa United in the NPFL.

Club career

Etim made his league debut in the NPFL in the 2010—11 season with Kaduna United.

He left Kaduna United after two seasons (2010 to 2012) and joined seven-time NPFL champions, Enugu Rangers, where he spent five seasons (2012 to 2017).

Etim won the 2016 Nigeria Professional Football League title with Enugu Rangers.

During the summer of 2016, Etim featured for NPFL All-stars in the tour of Spain. On 10 August 2016, he suffered a strain on his left foot in the 2–1 loss to Valencia CF at the Alzira Stadium.

The injury ruled him out of the rest of the tour, and his place was taken by Ifeanyi Nweke in subsequent matches - against Atlético Madrid and Málaga CF.

Matthew Etim joined Uyo-based club, Akwa United from Enugu Rangers on a one-year deal in December 2017, with an option for an extension. 

He was unveiled at the Godswill Akpabio International Stadium on 6 January 2018.

He took over the team's no. 4 jersey from Alhassan Ibrahim, after the former Nigeria national under-20 football team player moved to FK Austria Wien.

International career

Etim made his debut in the 4-1 win over Niger in a Group C matchday one tie at the 2016 African Nations Championship on 18 January 2016. He played from start to finish.

The defender went on to star the whole duration of the 1-1 draw against Tunisia and 1-0 loss to Guinea in the second and third group matches respectively, as Nigeria failed to advance to the knockout stages.

Club honours
Enugu Rangers
 Nigeria Professional Football League: 2016

References

Living people
1989 births
Nigerian footballers
Association football defenders
Nigeria international footballers
Sportspeople from Akwa Ibom State
Nigeria A' international footballers
2016 African Nations Championship players